Bård Løken (born 6 February 1964 in Vadsø) is a Norwegian photographer, living in Elverum.

He has worked as a photographer since 1985. He has taken pictures for a number of books, and worked with some of Norway's best known authors since the start of the 1990s. Løken mainly deals with nature and landscape photography. He has also been picture editor for the last four issues of NAF Veibok.

Løken is a member of Norske Naturfotografer and signed to the picture agency Samfoto .

Bibliography
 Oslomarka – Årstidene, naturen, stemningene, Ernst G. Mortensens forlag, Oslo (1993) 
 Markaboka (with Jørn Areklett Omre), Orion Forlag, Oslo (1995)
 Jotunheimen, bill.mrk. 2469 (with Erlend Loe), Orion Forlag, Oslo (2000) 
 Med kamera i naturen, Naturforlaget, Oslo (2001) 
 Norway: facing the north (with Trym Ivar Bergsmo), Culture and art publishing house, Beijing, China (2001) 
 Norske omveier – i blues og bilder (with Lars Saabye Christensen), Orion Forlag, Oslo (2005) 
 Inn i naturen (with Jan Chr Næss), Damm, Oslo (2007) 
 Naturlig rik (with Mia Svagård, Arne Næss and Henry D. Thoreau), Tun forlag, Oslo (2007) 
 Industrispor (with various authors), Aschehoug forlag, Oslo (2008) 
 Hedmark i dikt og bilder (with Jørn Areklett Omre, editor Knut Imerslund), Kom Forlag, Oslo (2009) 

Norwegian photographers
People from Elverum
1964 births
Living people
People from Vadsø